Jolanda Schir (born 15 January 1943) is an Italian alpine skier. She competed in two events at the 1960 Winter Olympics. She is the sister of the other skier Jerta Schir.

References

External links
 

1943 births
Living people
Italian female alpine skiers
Olympic alpine skiers of Italy
Alpine skiers at the 1960 Winter Olympics
Sportspeople from Trentino